Real World Studios is a residential recording studio complex founded by Peter Gabriel and situated in the village of Box, Wiltshire, England, near to the city of Bath. It is closely associated with the Real World Records record label, Real World Publishing, and the WOMAD Festival, whose offices are also based at the complex.

Facility

The largest recording space, appropriately referred to as the Big Room, is a 2,000 square foot combination live room and control room with a custom wraparound 72-channel SSL 9000 XL K Series mixing console at its centre, with large windows offering expansive views of the adjacent millpond and gardens. Although the Big Room has a separate machine room and two isolation booths, it is designed as one large collaborative recording space with no dividing walls. Alternately, the Big Room also functions as a Dolby Surround 7.1-certified film mixing room.

Adjoining the Big Room and within the former mill building is the Wood Room. This room utilizes a 24-channel SSL AWS 924 console, and features a more lively acoustic character, mezzanine floor and movable acoustic screens, as well as its own isolation booth. The Big Room and The Wood Room can be booked together for a larger recording space, or individually for smaller or lower-budget projects. Also available is the Rehearsal Room--a 49 foot by 16 foot space for rehearsals or pre-production.

The Red Room is a dedicated mixing and production room well-suited for post-production, ADR recording, and mixing for television and film, while a Foley stage facilitates recording Foley.

The studio also has the Writing Room and the Work Room, which are Gabriel's own private workspaces.

A residential studio complex designed as an artist's retreat, Real World offers living accommodations. The House offers six double bedrooms, a living room, dining room, and laundry facilities. The Cottage is a separate building with living room, bedroom, bathroom, and mobile recording rig. Real World's kitchen offers continental breakfast, lunch, and two-course evening dinner prepared by an in-house chef.

History
In 1986, following the success of his album So, Peter Gabriel decided to pursue a permanent recording facility. Knowing that he wanted to remain in the same area as the Ashcombe House that he had been renting, and that he wanted the new location to be close to running water, Gabriel looked at several sites, mostly old mills, near Bath. A 13-acre site in the village of Box featured the By Brook and several existing buildings, including Box Mill, a 200-year-old water mill that had been converted to offices in the 1950s. Gabriel purchased the site and its buildings from Spafax in 1987.

Gabriel's vision for the new studio was a unified space where everyone could work together, where musicians aren't separated from the engineer or producer. Additionally, he wanted these creative spaces to have elements of light, air, and water. Working with architectural design firm FCBStudios, the existing buildings were converted and a new building ('The Big Room') was added. The new complex provided both recording studio facilities and residential accommodations.

Clients
Notable clients of Real World Studios include A-ha, Stereophonics, Seal, James, Reef, Therapy?, Alicia Keys, Amy Winehouse, Placebo, Van Morrison, Beyoncé, Natalie Duncan, Björk, Black Grape, Coldplay, Mumford & Sons, Idles, Jay-Z, Kanye West, Paolo Nutini, Robert Plant, The Vamps, Paloma Faith, Rag'n'Bone Man, Tom Jones, New Order, Kasabian, Katie Melua, Kylie Minogue, Laura Marling, Pixies, Sade, Sia, Blue October, Harry Styles, Maggie Rogers, Marillion, The 1975, Foals and Indigo Girls.

Real World Studios has been host to film and TV projects including Quantum of Solace, The Golden Compass, Green Zone and The No. 1 Ladies' Detective Agency.

References

External links

Real World Records
BBC Wiltshire: Real World Studios video tour
Video Feature: SOS visits Real World Studios
FeildenCleggBradleyStudios – Real World Studios

Recording studios in England
Peter Gabriel
Real World Records albums
Box, Wiltshire